9165 Raup, provisional designation , is a stony Hungaria asteroid and exceptionally slow rotator from the inner regions of the asteroid belt, approximately 4.7 kilometers in diameter.

It was discovered on 27 September 1987, by American astronomer couple Carolyn and Eugene Shoemaker at the U.S. Palomar Observatory in California. The asteroid was later named after American paleontologist David M. Raup.

Classification and orbit 

Raup is a bright S-type asteroid is a member of the Hungaria family, which form the innermost dense concentration of asteroids in the Solar System. It orbits the Sun in the innermost main-belt at a distance of 1.8–2.2 AU once every 2 years and 10 months (1,022 days). Its orbit has an eccentricity of 0.10 and an inclination of 25° with respect to the ecliptic.

Physical characteristics

Slow rotator 

In September 2015, a rotational lightcurve of Raup was obtained from photometric observations by American astronomer Brian Warner at his Palmer Divide Station in Colorado. It gave a well-defined rotation period of  hours with a brightness variation of 1.34 magnitude.

As of 2016, it is the 3rd slowest rotating minor planet in the Light Curve Data Base (LCDB). Also, the lightcurve's high amplitude indicates that the body has a non-spheroidal shape. Brian Warner's 2015-observation supersedes a previously obtained lightcurve that gave a significantly shorter period of  hours with an amplitude of 1.05 magnitude.

Diameter and albedo 

According to the survey carried out by the NEOWISE mission of NASA's Wide-field Infrared Survey Explorer, Raup measures 4.8 kilometers in diameter and its surface has a high albedo of 0.329, while the Collaborative Asteroid Lightcurve Link assumes a standard albedo for Hungaria asteroids of 0.30, and calculates a diameter of 4.6 kilometers, based on an absolute magnitude of 13.6.

Naming 

This minor planet was named in honor of American David M. Raup (1933–2015), paleontologist and expert of the fossil record at UChicago. Raup's theories contributed to the knowledge of extinction events and suggested, that the extinction of dinosaurs was part of a cycle of mass extinctions. the official naming citation was published on 23 November 1999.

References

External links 
 Asteroid Lightcurve Database (LCDB), query form (info )
 Dictionary of Minor Planet Names, Google books
 Asteroids and comets rotation curves, CdR – Observatoire de Genève, Raoul Behrend
 Discovery Circumstances: Numbered Minor Planets (5001)-(10000) – Minor Planet Center
 
 

 

009165
Discoveries by Carolyn S. Shoemaker
Discoveries by Eugene Merle Shoemaker
Named minor planets
009165
19870927